The 2009 Final Resolution was a professional wrestling pay-per-view (PPV) event produced by the Total Nonstop Action Wrestling (TNA) promotion, which took place on December 20, 2009 at the TNA Impact! Zone in Orlando, Florida. It was the sixth event under the Final Resolution chronology and the last TNA pay-per-view to use a six-sided ring until Destination X 2011.

In October 2017, with the launch of the Global Wrestling Network, the event became available to stream on demand. It would later be available on Impact Plus in May 2019.

Storylines

Final Resolution feature eight professional wrestling matches that involved different wrestlers from pre-existing scripted feuds and storylines. Wrestlers were portrayed as villains, heroes, or less distinguishable characters in the scripted events that built tension and culminated into a wrestling match or series of matches.

Results

References

External links
Official Website
Final Resolution at In Demand.com
TNA Wrestling.com

Final Resolution
2009 in professional wrestling in Florida
Professional wrestling shows in Orlando, Florida
December 2009 events in the United States
2009 Total Nonstop Action Wrestling pay-per-view events